Jaroslav Řezáč (6 February 1886 – 29 May 1974) was a Czechoslovak ice hockey player who was named to the Czechoslovakian national team for both the 1924 Winter Olympics and in the 1928 Winter Olympics, though he did not play any games.

External links

Olympic ice hockey tournaments 1924 and 1928  

1886 births
1974 deaths
Czechoslovak ice hockey goaltenders
People from Jičín
Sportspeople from the Hradec Králové Region